The Mason–Dixon Conference is a defunct NCAA Division II (former NCAA College Division) athletics conference, formed in 1936 and disbanded in October 1978. A track championship bearing the conference's name continued for several years after the demise of the all-sports league.  Its members were predominantly from states bordering the eponymous Mason–Dixon line.  A similarly named Mason-Dixon Athletic Conference began play in NCAA Division II men's basketball in 1983–84 with three of the previous members (Mount St. Mary's University, Randolph–Macon College, University of Maryland–Baltimore County) plus Longwood University, Liberty University and the University of Pittsburgh at Johnstown.

Originally for track and field only, it was established in 1936 by Waldo Hamilton and Dorsey Griffith who both coached the sport at Johns Hopkins University and The Catholic University of America respectively. Its main purpose was to provide an annual championship meet for smaller colleges. The circuit began with nine member schools. Besides the institutions for which the founders represented, the others were American University, Gallaudet University, Randolph–Macon College, University of Baltimore, University of Delaware, Washington College and Western Maryland College.

Within four years it began to include other sports. Men's basketball was added in 1940. The Mason–Dixon Conference sought to "solidify small college athletics and to stimulate a competitive spirit."

Member schools

Founding members

Notes

Other members

Notes

Membership timeline

Champions by sport

Men's basketball

1941 – Western Maryland
1942 – Loyola
1943 – Gallaudet
1944 – Mount Saint Mary's
1945 – American
1946 – American
1947 – Loyola
1948 – Loyola
1949 – Loyola
1950 – American
1951 – American
1952 – Baltimore
1953 – Loyola

1954 – Mount Saint Mary's
1955 – Mount Saint Mary's
1956 – Mount Saint Mary's
1957 – Mount Saint Mary's
1958 – American
1959 – American
1960 – American and Mount Saint Mary's
1961 – Catholic and Mount Saint Mary's
1962 – Mount Saint Mary's
1963 – Mount Saint Mary's
1964 – Catholic
1965 – Randolph–Macon
1966 – Randolph–Macon

1967 – Mount Saint Mary's
1968 – Roanoke
1969 – Old Dominion
1970 – Roanoke
1971 – Loyola
1972 – Roanoke
1973 – Loyola
1974 – Randolph–Macon
1975 – Randolph–Macon
1976 – Baltimore
1977 – Towson State
1978 – Towson State

Football

1946 – Delaware
1947 – 
1948 – 
1949 – 
1950 – 
1951 – 
1952 – 
1953 – 
1954 – 
1955 – 

1956 – 
1957 – 
1958 – 
1959 – 
1960 –  and 
1961 – 
1962 – 
1963 – 
1964 – 
1965 – 

1966 – 
1967 – 
1968 – 
1969 – 
1970 – 
1971 – 
1972 – 
1973 – 
1974 –

See also 
 List of defunct college football conferences
 Chesapeake Conference
 Old Dominion Athletic Conference (ODAC)

References

 
1936 establishments in the United States
1974 disestablishments in the United States